"Here We Come" is a song by American producer/rapper Timbaland. It features frequent collaborators Missy Elliott and Magoo and serves as the lead single for Timbaland's solo debut album, Tim's Bio: Life from da Bassment (1998). The song also features background vocals by Playa and Darryl Pearson. While the song charted and was released via radio airplay on November 17, 1998, it was not granted a physical release in the United States until March 2, 1999; and on October 5, 1999 for Germany.

Here We Come interpolates the melody from the theme song of the 1967 Spider-Man TV series, written by Paul Francis Webster, with music composed by J. Robert Harris.

Music video
The music video premiered on MTV2 in mid-October 1998. Like the song's concept and interpolation, the video follows a synopsis loosely based on the early Spider-Man comic series. The latter of the video features cameo appearances by Missy Elliott's close friends Ginuwine and Aaliyah. The video was directed by Francis Lawrence.

Track listings and formats
European CD single
 "Here We Come" (featuring Playa, Magoo & Missy "Misdemeanor" Elliott)  — 4:36   
 "Talking Trash" (featuring Bassey) — 4:37

UK 12" vinyl
 "Here We Come" (featuring Playa, Magoo & Missy "Misdemeanor" Elliott)  — 4:36   
 "Talking Trash" (featuring Bassey) — 4:37 
 "I Get It On" (featuring Bassey & Lil' Man) — 4:45

UK CD single
 "Here We Come" (featuring Playa, Magoo & Missy "Misdemeanor" Elliott)  — 4:36

US 12" vinyl
 "Here We Come" (Album Version) — 4:38
 "Here We Come" (Instrumental) — 4:38
 "Here We Come" (Acapella) — 4:06
 "DJ Timmy Tim's BC Mix" — 9:46
 "Here We Come" (Radio Version) — 4:37

Charts

Release history

References

1998 debut singles
1998 songs
Timbaland songs
Song recordings produced by Timbaland
Missy Elliott songs
Songs written by Missy Elliott
Music videos directed by Francis Lawrence
Songs written by Melvin Barcliff
Songs written by Timbaland
Songs with lyrics by Paul Francis Webster